Victor Tayar (1931–1993) was an Israeli artist and political figure.

Biography
Born in Libya, Tayar made aliyah to Israel and settled in Jaffa.

During the 1970s he was amongst the leaders of the Black Panthers. For the 1981 elections he headed a party called Amkha, but won only 460 votes. In the 1984 elections Amkha won 733 votes. For the 1988 elections the list was renamed "Unity - for Victor Tayar to the Knesset", but won only 446 votes.

He died in 1993.

References

1931 births
Israeli people of Libyan-Jewish descent
Jewish socialists
Leaders of political parties in Israel
Israeli artists
1993 deaths
Black Panthers (Israel) politicians